Dan yr Ogof, at the National Showcaves Centre for Wales, is a  long cave system in south Wales, about  north of Ystradgynlais and  southwest of Brecon, in the Brecon Beacons National Park. It is the main feature of a show cave complex, which is claimed to be the largest in the UK and is a tourist attraction in Wales. The first section of the cave system is open to the public, but the extensive cave system beyond is scheduled as a national nature reserve and is open only to bona fide cavers.

The bones of some 42 humans, as well as numerous animal bones, have been found in one of the nearby chambers of this cave system. In a 2005 poll of Radio Times readers, Dan yr Ogof was named as the greatest natural wonder in Britain.

Exploration
  

The cave was first explored in 1912 by three local brothers, Edwin, Tommy and Jeff Morgan, using candles and primitive equipment. Completely unsure of what they would discover, they armed themselves with a revolver. Edwin was the first to enter, as he was the smallest of the Morgan brothers. Initial expedition was halted at a large lake, which they later managed to cross by coracle. They eventually crossed three more lakes in the same manner, but were stopped by a tight crawl.

This squeeze, known as the Long Crawl, was first passed by Eileen Davies, a member of the South Wales Caving Club in 1963. The initials 'PO' were found by Eileen Davies at the pitch to Gerard Platten Hall. Peter Ogden had not descended the pitch due to lack of the required equipment and was prevented from returning by an extended period of bad weather. Exploration has been steadily continued by later cavers who have extended the cave to its present  length. Some of this length was reached by cave diving. One of these explorers was Martyn Farr, who wrote a book about the system in which he claims that the system will eventually be extended to at least .

Filming location
The cave was used as a filming location for the Doctor Who serial The Pirate Planet.

See also
Pwll Dwfn

References

External links
 The official Dan yr Ogof showcave site
 Dan yr Ogof interactive survey

Show caves in the United Kingdom
Swansea Valley
Fforest Fawr
Tourist attractions in Powys
Caves of Powys